Goodenia faucium, commonly known as the Mount Liebig goodenia, is a species of flowering plant in the family Goodeniaceae and is endemic to the Northern Territory. It is a shrubby perennial with narrow elliptic to egg-shaped, toothed leaves and racemes of yellow flowers.

Description

Taxonomy and naming
Goodenia faucium was first formally described in 1980 by Roger Charles Carolin in the journal Telopea from material collected by George Chippendale in a gorge near Mount Liebig in 1957. The specific epithet (faucium) refers to the narrow valleys near Mount Liebig where this species appears to be confined.

Distribution and habitat
This goodenia grows in the MacDonnell Ranges where it usually grows in cracks in cliff faces.

Conservation status
Goodenia faucium is classified as "near threatened" under the Northern Territory Government Territory Parks and Wildlife Conservation Act 1976.

References

faucium
Flora of the Northern Territory
Plants described in 1980
Taxa named by Roger Charles Carolin
Endemic flora of Australia